Basseux is a commune in the Pas-de-Calais department in the Hauts-de-France region in northern France.

Geography
A small farming village located 8 miles (12 km) southwest of Arras on the D1 road, which follows the route of a Roman road. The small river Crinchon flows by the commune.

History

 Mentioned in the 7th century for the first time, as ‘Batsalis’ and later as Batseus (1154) and Basceu in 1277.
 In 1711, the troops of the Marquis de Hautefort, Lieutenant General of the armies of Louis XIV, pillaged the town at the time of the War of Spanish Succession (1700–1713).
 Between 1788 and 1789, a presbytery was built and the village had 217 inhabitants.
 On 8 April 1834, half the village was burnt down. An inscription on the gate of the church recalls the incident: "On the 8th April 1834, 17 houses of this village were burned down. They were all rebuilt in the same year by the kindness of King Louis-Philippe of France and the help of the government and the département together with donations from many generous people. This stone was placed by the inhabitants of Basseux in recognition of their benefactors".
 On 1 January 1871, a skirmish took place between French Dragoons and Prussian Uhlans.

Population

Sights
 The war cemetery.
 The church of Notre-Dame, dating from the twelfth century.

See also
Communes of the Pas-de-Calais department

References

External links

 The CWGC cemetery of De Cusine Ravine

Communes of Pas-de-Calais